William Richardson (lived ) was a Tyneside songwriter, who, according to the information given by John Bell in his Rhymes of Northern Bards published in 1812, has the poem or song "Hotspur, A Ballad - In the Manner of the Ancient Minstrels" attributed to his name.

The song is not written in Geordie dialect but has a strong Northern connection. Nothing more appears to be known of this person, or their life.

References

External links
 Rhymes of Northern Bards by John Bell Junior

English songwriters
People from Newcastle upon Tyne (district)
Musicians from Tyne and Wear
Geordie songwriters
Year of birth missing
Year of death missing